COVID-19 vaccination in Djibouti is an ongoing immunisation campaign against severe acute respiratory syndrome coronavirus 2 (SARS-CoV-2), the virus that causes coronavirus disease 2019 (COVID-19), in response to the ongoing pandemic in the country.

Djibouti began its vaccination program on 15 March 2021, initially with 24,000 doses of AstraZeneca's Covishield vaccine provided through COVAX.

History

Timeline

March 2021
By the end of the month 455 vaccine doses had been administered.

April 2021
By the end of the month 11,343 vaccine doses had been administered.

May 2021
By the end of the month 14,943 vaccine doses had been administered.

June 2021
By the end of the month 35,606 vaccine doses had been administered.

August 2021
By the end of the month 54,229 vaccine doses had been administered.

September 2021
By the end of the month 67,229 vaccine doses had been administered.

October 2021
By the end of the month 92,097 vaccine doses had been administered while 7% of the targeted population had been fully vaccinated.

November 2021
By the end of the month 99,679 vaccine doses had been administered while 7% of the targeted population had been fully vaccinated.

December 2021
By the end of the month 200,309 vaccine doses had been administered while 23% of the targeted population had been fully vaccinated.

January 2022
By the end of the month 213,820 vaccine doses had been administered while 25% of the targeted population had been fully vaccinated.

February 2022
By the end of the month 240,576 vaccine doses had been administered while 100,289 persons had been fully vaccinated.

March 2022
By the end of the month 259,551 vaccine doses had been administered while 109,762 persons had been fully vaccinated.

April 2022
By the end of the month 278,643 vaccine doses had been administered while 119,296 persons had been fully vaccinated.

Progress 
Cumulative vaccinations in Djibouti

References 

Djibouti
Vaccination
Djibouti